Eric Jelen (born 11 March 1965) is a former tennis player from Germany, who won one singles (1989, Bristol) and five doubles titles during his professional career.

The right-hander Jelen reached his highest singles ATP-ranking on 7 July 1986, when he became World No. 23. Jelen was a member of two Davis Cup-winning teams. In 1988, he teamed with Boris Becker in doubles to earn the win that guaranteed a West German victory over Sweden in the final. The following year, West Germany successfully defended the title by defeating Sweden in the final, and Becker and Jelen again won the doubles match.

Jelen had two spells as coach for Boris Becker, the first spell for the 1992 Wimbledon tournament, and the second spell lasting for seven months from May 1993 to December 1993.

Career finals

Singles (1 title – 1 runner-up)

Doubles (5 titles – 6 runners-up)

References

External links
 
 
 

1965 births
Living people
German male tennis players
Olympic tennis players of West Germany
Sportspeople from Trier
Tennis players at the 1988 Summer Olympics
West German male tennis players